Antibody opsonization is a process by which a pathogen is marked for phagocytosis.

Given normal inflammatory circumstances, microbial pathogen-associated molecular patterns (PAMPs) bind with the endocytic pattern recognition receptors (PRRs) of phagocytes, which mediates neutrophil mediation or macrophage phagocytosis. As well as endocytic PRRs, phagocytes furthermore express opsonin receptors such as Fc receptor and complement receptor 1 (CR1). Should the microbe be coated with opsonising antibodies or C3b complement, the co-stimulation of endocytic PRR and opsonin receptor increases the efficacy of the phagocytic process, enhancing the lysosomal elimination of the infective agent. This mechanism of antibody-mediated increase in phagocytic efficacy is named opsonization.

Opsonization involves the binding of an opsonin (e.g., antibody) to an epitope on a pathogen. After opsonin binds to the membrane, phagocytes are attracted to the pathogen.  The Fab portion of the antibody binds to the antigen, whereas the Fc portion of the antibody binds to an Fc receptor on the phagocyte, facilitating phagocytosis.  The core receptor + opsonin complex also creates byproducts like C3b and C4b which are important components for the efficient function of the complement system where they can mediate inflammation, such as when C3b binds to C3-convertase, or they can facilitate the formation of the Complement membrane attack complex (MAC) by being deposited on the cell surface of the pathogen. 

In antibody-dependent cell-mediated cytotoxicity the pathogen does not need to be phagocytized to be destroyed. During this process, the pathogen is opsonized and bound with the antibody IgG via its Fab domain.  This allows the antibody binding of an immune effector cell via its Fc domain. Antibody-dependent cell-mediated inherent mediation then triggers a release of lysis products from the bound immune effector cell (monocytes, neutrophils, eosinophils and NK cells).  Lack of mediation can cause inflammation of surrounding tissues and damage to healthy cells.

References

Immune system